The following is a list of rap rock artists with articles on Wikipedia. The list includes bands and musicians that have been described as a form of rap rock, including the subgenres rap metal and rapcore, by professional journalists at some stage in their career.

List

0-9 
2 Skinnee J's
28 Days
311

A 
Astroid Boys

B 
Back-On
Beastie Boys
Biohazard
Bloodhound Gang
Body Count
Boondox
Brougham
Butterfingers

C 
Candiria
Chronic Future
City Morgue
Clawfinger
Confrontation Camp
Crazy Town
Cypress Hill

D 
Death Grips
Deftones
Dog Eat Dog
downset.
Down with Webster
Deuce
Dropout Kings

E 
El Pus
Everlast
E.Town Concrete

F 
Faith No More
Falling in Reverse
Fire from the Gods
Fever 333
Flobots
From Ashes to New

G 
Gorillaz
Gym Class Heroes
Ghostemane

H 
H-Blockx
Hazen Street
Headstrong
Hed PE
Hollywood Undead
Hot Action Cop

I 
Incubus
Insane Clown Posse

K 
Kevin Rudolf
Kid Rock
Korn
Kottonmouth Kings
Kush

L 
Legz Diamond
Len
Lil Peep
Lil Uzi Vert
Lil Wayne
Lil Yachty
Limp Bizkit
Linkin Park

M 

Manafest
Man with a Mission
Methods of Mayhem
Molotov

N 
New Kingdom
 N.E.R.D.

O 
One Day as a Lion
OPM

P 
Papa Roach
Peeping Tom
Phunk Junkeez
Pleymo
P.O.D.
Post Malone
Powerman 5000
Primer 55
Project 86
Prophets of Rage

Q 
Quarashi

R 
Rage Against the Machine
Red Hot Chili Peppers
Reveille
Run-D.M.C.

S 
Saliva
Senser
Serial Joe
Shootyz Groove
Shuvel
Slapshock
Steriogram
Street Sweeper Social Club
Stuck Mojo
Sugar Ray
SX-10

T 
Thousand Foot Krutch
Transplants
Trik Turner
Twenty One Pilots
Twiztid

U 
Uncle Kracker
Urban Dance Squad
Underground Authority

V 
Vanilla Ice

Y 
Yungblud

Z 
Zebrahead

See also 
Rap rock
Rap metal
List of alternative metal artists
List of funk metal and funk rock bands
List of nu metal bands

References 

Rap rock